USS Cayuga (LST-1186) was a  of the United States Navy which replaced the traditional bow door-design tank landing ships (LSTs). The vessel was constructed by the National Steel and Shipbuilding Company in San Diego, California and was launched in 1969 and commissioned in 1970. Cayuga took part in the Vietnam War and Gulf War in American service. Decommissioned in 1994, the LST was transferred to the Brazilian Navy the same year on loan and renamed NDCC Mattoso Maia (G 28). The ship was purchased by Brazil outright in 2001. Mattoso Maia is currently in service.

Design and description
As the traditional flat-fronted bow door form for LSTs would not be capable of such speeds, the Newport class adopted a traditional ship hull pointed bow above which was mounted a  aluminum ramp slung supported by two derrick arms. This made the Newport class the first to depart from the standard LST design that had been developed in early World War II.

Cayuga was fitted with six Alco 16-645-ES diesel engines turning two shafts, three to each shaft. The ship was also equipped with a bow thruster to allow for better maneuvering near causeways and to hold position while offshore during the unloading of amphibious vehicles.

The Newport class were larger and faster than previous LSTs and were able to transport tanks, heavy vehicles and engineer groups and supplies that were too large for helicopters or smaller landing craft to carry. The LSTs have a ramp forward of the superstructure that connects the lower tank deck with the main deck and a passage large enough to allow access to the parking area amidships. The vessels are also equipped with a stern gate to allow the unloading of amphibious vehicles directly into the water or to unload onto a utility landing craft (LCU) or pier. At either end of the tank deck there is a  turntable that permits vehicles to turn around without having to reverse. The vessels also have davits for four vehicle and personnel landing craft (LCVPs) and could carry four pontoon causeway sections along the sides of the hull.

Cayuga was initially armed with four Mark 33 /50 caliber guns in two twin turrets. The vessel was equipped with two Mk 63 gun control fire systems (GCFS) for the 3-inch guns, but these were removed in 1977–1978. The ship also had SPS-10 surface search radar. Atop the stern gate, the vessels mounted a helicopter deck. They had a maximum complement of 213 including 11 officers.

Construction and career

United States Navy service

The ship was ordered as part of the Fiscal Year 1966 group of eight on 15 July 1966. The LST was laid down on 28 September 1968 at San Diego, California, by the National Steel & Shipbuilding Corporation. Named for the county in New York, Cayuga was launched on 12 July 1969, sponsored by the wife of Vice Admiral Luther C. Heinz, Commander of Amphibious Forces, Atlantic. The vessel was commissioned on 8 August 1970. Following commissioning, Cayuga was assigned to the Amphibious Force, Pacific Fleet and home ported at Long Beach, California. The LST alternated amphibious training operations along the west coast of the United States with deployments to the Far East. Cayuga earned two battle stars for Vietnam service.

Cayuga and Duluth were fired on by North Vietnamese Army artillery during the assault on 24 May 1972. The destroyer  and other gunfire support ships silenced the opposing guns to cover the retreat of the landing ships.

Cayuga and Amphibious Squadron 5 (PHIBRON 5) participated in Operations Desert Shield and Desert Storm in 1990/1991. PHIBRON 5 joined the rest of the US amphibious forces in the North Arabian Sea after sailing across the Pacific. The unit and returning to its port in Long Beach in April 1991 after an extended deployment. Cayuga carried elements of the 13th Marine Expeditionary Unit's (13th MEU) Battalion Landing Team 1/4. On 30 October 1990, Cayuga was its Marines were detached and sent to train with United Arab Emirates forces. At the end of October, the 13th MEU set out for its return to the United States.

Brazilian Navy service 
Cayuga was decommissioned 26 August 1994 and leased to the Brazilian Navy. The vessel was recommissioned into the Brazilian Navy on 30 August and renamed NDCC Mattoso Maia (G 28), for Admiral Jorge do Paço Mattoso Maia, Minister of the Navy 1958–1961. On 19 September 2000 the ship was purchased outright by Brazil. On 23 July 2002, Cayuga was struck from the United States Naval Vessel Register.

In popular culture

In 1977, Cayuga is portrayed in the air disaster film Airport '77 by Jerry Jameson as involved in the rescueing of the passengers of the sunk Boeing 747.

Notes

Citations

References

External links 

 

Newport-class tank landing ships
Ships built in San Diego
1969 ships
Cold War amphibious warfare vessels of the United States
Ships transferred from the United States Navy to the Brazilian Navy
Amphibious warfare vessels of the Brazilian Navy
Amphibious warfare vessels of Brazil